Liesbeth Migchelsen (11 March 1971 – 27 May 2020) was a Dutch footballer who represented the Netherlands women's national team 95 times between 1990 and 2008. She was the sister of former footballer .

She coached Australian W-League team Canberra United from 2013 to 2014.

International goals
Scores and results list the Netherlands goal tally first.

Honours
SV Saestum
 Dutch Championship (1): 1999–00

SV Fortuna Wormerveer 	
 Dutch Cup (1): 2005–06

AZ Alkmaar
 Eredivisie (2): 2007–08 and 2008–09

References

1971 births
2020 deaths
People from Harderwijk
Netherlands women's international footballers
Dutch women's footballers
Women's association football defenders
Dutch football managers
Dutch expatriate sportspeople in Germany
Expatriate women's footballers in Germany
Frauen-Bundesliga players
Eredivisie (women) players
FFC Heike Rheine players
AZ Alkmaar (women) players
Dutch expatriate women's footballers
Deaths from cancer in the Netherlands
Puck Deventer players
Dutch expatriate football managers
Expatriate soccer managers in Australia
Dutch expatriate sportspeople in Australia
Footballers from Gelderland